Viktória Madarász (born 12 May 1985 in Budapest) is a Hungarian race walker. She competed in the  km event at the 2012 Summer Olympics.

Competition record

References

External links 
 
 
 
 
 

1985 births
Living people
Athletes from Budapest
Hungarian female racewalkers
Olympic athletes of Hungary
Athletes (track and field) at the 2012 Summer Olympics
Athletes (track and field) at the 2016 Summer Olympics
Athletes (track and field) at the 2020 Summer Olympics
World Athletics Championships athletes for Hungary
European Athletics Championships medalists